Robert Lee Allen (May 22, 1927 - November 8, 2017), was an American politician who was a Republican member of the Utah State Senate. He was a farmer, rancher and real estate broker. Allen was also commissioner of Box Elder County, Utah from 1993 to 2000.

References

1927 births
2017 deaths
Republican Party members of the Utah House of Representatives
Politicians from Ogden, Utah
People from Garland, Utah
County commissioners in Utah
Farmers from Utah
Ranchers from Utah
People from Tremonton, Utah